FK Pacific was an American soccer team, founded in 2003. The team participated in the Pacific Coast Soccer League (PCSL), a recognised Division III league in the American Soccer Pyramid which features teams from western Canada and the Pacific Northwest region of the United States of America. They last participated in the PCSL in 2007.

Pacific played their home matches at the Starfire Sports Complex in the city of Tukwila, Washington, 11 miles south of downtown Seattle, and at the Memorial Stadium in Seattle itself. The team's colors were red, blue and black.

2007 Roster

Year-by-year

References

External links
 FK Pacific

Soccer clubs in Washington (state)
2003 establishments in Washington (state)